Beşiktaş men's basketball section started out in the year 1933, before being halted in 1936, and then resuming once again in 1940. Since then, Beşiktaş has played in the first Turkish Basketball Super League, in every season, except in the 1988–89 season, due to their relegation to the Turkish Basketball First League after the 1987–88 season. The club won the Turkish Basketball Super League, under the management of Ateş Çubukçu and Tom Davis, in the 1974–75 season.

According to the official records, in Turkey, basketball was first played in 1904 at Robert College. An American physical education teacher laid the foundations of this sport in Turkey. 7 years later, Ahmet Robenson, a physical education teacher in Galatasaray High School decided to introduce a new game to students in 1911. Robenson, who also became a Galatasaray S.K. president later, popularized this sport in Turkey.

Galatasaray SK is the pioneer in Turkish basketball history, and basketball had always been very important for the club. The team has won 11 national championship titles and 15 İstanbul League titles. Former president of the club, Özhan Canaydın was a former player of basketball team.

Honours

Head to Head
As of 13 March 2022

Sponsorship naming
Due to sponsorship deals, Galatasaray and Beşiktaş have been also known as:

 Galatasaray Cafe Crown: 2005–2011
 Galatasaray Medical Park: 2011–2013
 Galatasaray Liv Hospital: 2013–2015
 Galatasaray Odeabank: 2015–2018
Galatasaray Doğa Sigorta: 2018–2020
Galatasaray Nef: 2021–2022

 Beşiktaş Cola Turka: 2005–2011
 Beşiktaş Milangaz: 2011–2012
 Beşiktaş Integral Forex: 2013–2015
 Beşiktaş Sompo Japan: 2015–2020
 Beşiktaş Icrypex: 2021-

Turkish League Matches

Turkish Cup Matches

European Competitions

See also
The Intercontinental Derby
Beşiktaş - Fenerbahçe rivalry (basketball)

References

Galatasaray S.K. (men's basketball)
Turkish Basketball Super League teams
Basketball rivalries